MCII may refer to:

 1102 in Roman numerals
 MCII (album), Studio album by Mikal Cronin
 Midnight Club II, a racing video game
 Mental contrasting with implementation intentions, a behavioral psychological intervention by Gabriele Oettingen